KOSS (1380 AM, "NewsTalk 1380") is a commercial radio station that is licensed to Lancaster, California and serves the Antelope Valley area. The station is owned by High Desert Broadcasting and broadcasts a news/talk format, featuring programming from ABC Radio, HLN, and Radio America.

History
The station signed on as KBVM in August 1956. KBVM changed its call sign to KKZZ in September 1973, then to KOTE in 1983. On January 1, 1987, KOTE changed its call letters to KHJJ, adopting the branding "KHJ 1380" and a news/talk format.

In 2000, the station became KWJL (K-Jewel 1380) and featured an adult standards format. In 2004, KWJL flipped to Spanish oldies as "Joyas 1380" (joya is the Spanish word for "jewel").

In September 2007, KWJL and KUTY swapped formats, and KWJL became "NewsTalk 1380". The call sign was changed to KOSS in January 2008. The KOSS call letters had previously belonged to another local station, KVVS (105.5 FM), under a previous format.

KOSS was previously the radio home of Lancaster JetHawks minor league baseball, airing play-of-play coverage beginning in the team's 2010 season.

References

External links

FCC History Cards for KOSS

OSS
News and talk radio stations in the United States
Radio stations established in 1973
1973 establishments in California